Faustino Pérez-Moreno Gómez (born 25 April 1969), commonly known as Tino Pérez, is a Spanish futsal coach. He is a coach of Inter Movistar

External links

1969 births
Living people
Futsal coaches